The FA Cup 1952–53 is the 72nd season of the world's oldest football knockout competition; The Football Association Challenge Cup, or FA Cup for short. The large number of clubs entering the tournament from lower down the English football league system meant that the competition started with a number of preliminary and qualifying rounds. The 30 victorious teams from the Fourth Round Qualifying progressed to the First Round Proper.

Preliminary round

Ties

Replays

1st qualifying round

Ties

Replays

2nd replays

2nd qualifying round

Ties

Replays

3rd qualifying round

Ties

Replays

2nd replay

4th qualifying round
The teams that given byes to this round are: Bishop Auckland, Yeovil Town, Leytonstone, Guildford City, Chelmsford City, Gainsborough Trinity, Stockton, Dartford, Witton Albion, Weymouth, North Shields, Rhyl, Merthyr Tydfil, Hereford United, Scarborough, Wigan Athletic, Nelson, Worcester City, Tonbridge, Blyth Spartans, Wellington Town, Buxton, Folkestone and Gorleston

Ties

Replays

2nd replay

1952–53 FA Cup
See 1952–53 FA Cup for details of the rounds from the First Round Proper onwards.

External links
 Football Club History Database: FA Cup 1952–53
 FA Cup Past Results

Qualifying
FA Cup qualifying rounds